Al-Dawha is a Palestinian area located in Beit Jala, two kilometers southwest of Bethlehem. Originally a part of Beit Jala, in 1977 the mayor of Beit Jala made an official trip to Qatar where he was endowed with a sum of money to develop the town's infrastructure. As a tribute to Qatar's funding, an area of Beit Jala was renamed Al-Dawha, a reference to the Qatari capital of Doha. In 1996, this area was officially converted into the city of Al-Dawha along with the formation of the new municipal council of Al-Dawha.

According to the Palestinian Central Bureau of Statistics, the town had a population of 9,753 in 2007.

Al-Dawha is 90% Muslim and 10% Christians.

Footnotes

External links
Ad Doha City (fact sheet)
 Ad Doha City profile
 Ad Doha aerial photo
 The priorities and needs for development in Ad Doha city based on the community and local authorities' assessment

Towns in the West Bank
Populated places in the Bethlehem Governorate
Municipalities of West Bank